Anthene inconspicua, the inconspicuous ciliate blue, is a butterfly in the family Lycaenidae. The species was first described by Hamilton Herbert Druce in 1910. It is found in Ivory Coast, Ghana, eastern Nigeria, Cameroon, the Democratic Republic of the Congo (Mongala, Uele and Lualaba), Uganda and north-western Tanzania. The habitat consists of forests.

References

Butterflies described in 1910
Anthene